The 2000 United States presidential election in Virginia took place on November 7, 2000, and was part of the 2000 United States presidential election. Voters chose 13 representatives, or electors to the Electoral College, who voted for president and vice president.

Virginia had not gone Democratic in a presidential contest since 1964 and was won by Texas governor George W. Bush with a margin of victory of 8.04%. The Old Dominion state was considered to be a reliably Republican state and it would not vote Democratic again until 2008. The 2000 election was the last time Fairfax County, Virginia's most populous county, would go Republican. Fairfax’s swing toward the Democrats in recent years has contributed to the state turning Democratic. As of 2020, this is the last time Virginia has voted to the right of fellow Southern states Arkansas, Tennessee, Louisiana, or West Virginia.

, this was the last time Russell County, Southampton County, and the independent City of Norton voted Democratic for president, and the last time Fairfax County, Prince Edward County, Albemarle County, and the independent cities of Fairfax, Danville, and Williamsburg have voted Republican for president.

Primaries 
2000 Virginia Democratic presidential primary
2000 Virginia Republican presidential primary

Results

By county or independent city

Counties and Independent Cities that flipped from Democratic to Republican
Accomack (Largest city: Chincoteague)
Alleghany (Largest city: Clifton Forge)
Bath (Largest city: Hot Springs)
Bedford (Independent city)
Buckingham (Largest city: Dillwyn)
Buena Vista (Independent city)
Dinwiddie (Largest town: McKenney)
Essex (Largest city: Tappahannock)
Galax (Independent city)
Giles (Largest city: Pearisburg)
King and Queen (Largest CDP: King and Queen Courthouse)
Lee (Largest city: Pennington Gap)
Montgomery (Largest city: Blacksburg)
Nelson (Largest city: Nellysford)
Prince Edward (Largest city: Farmville)
Radford (Independent city)
Smyth (Largest city: Marion)
Tazewell (Largest city: Richlands)
Westmoreland (Largest city: Colonial Beach)
Williamsburg (Independent city)
Wise (Largest city: Big Stone Gap)

By congressional district
Bush won 8 of 11 congressional districts, including two held by other parties. Gore won 3 districts, including one held by a Republican.

Analysis 
Virginia voted for Bush by 8.03%. Although it was a comfortable margin, this made Virginia Bush's narrowest win in a state that had been carried by Bob Dole in 1996 (narrowly ahead of Colorado, which Bush won by 8.36%). Bush did well in most of rural Virginia, making some inroads into then-traditionally Democratic southwest Virginia, and also carried the highly-populated suburban areas outside Washington, D.C. (Fairfax, Prince William, Loudoun) and Richmond (Henrico, Chesterfield), as well as the independent city of Virginia Beach, which has a largely suburban character. However, he underperformed in Fairfax County, the most populous jurisdiction in the state, winning it by a slightly smaller margin than Dole had won it by amid his 8.5% national defeat in 1996.

References 

2000
Virginia
2000 Virginia elections